Mikhail Cirkunovs (born February 27, 1987), better known as Misha Cirkunov is a Latvian-born Canadian professional mixed martial artist, who competed in the Light heavyweight division of the Ultimate Fighting Championship (UFC).

Background
Son of Oleg and Olga, Cirkunov was born in Riga, Latvian SSR in 1987. In his childhood, Cirkunov was active in various sports like swimming, basketball, judo and karate. Growing up, Cirkunov dabbled into dubious circles which prompted the family to emigrate to Toronto, Ontario, when he was 13. With no skills in English, Cirkunov struggled in school but continued training judo and also picked up wrestling.

Cirkunov won junior nationals in judo in 2003, Greco-Roman wrestling national championship in 2005 and national championships in freestyle wrestling in 2005 and 2006. After winning the latter championship, Cirkunov became a Canadian citizen. After graduating from high school Cirkunov found Brazilian jiu-jitsu, briefly relocating to Las Vegas to train but returned to Canada to open his own gym. After the unsuccessful venture as a gym owner, he started training at recently opened Xtreme Couture satellite gym in Etobicoke.

Mixed martial arts career

Early career
Cirkunov made his professional debut in January 2010 and amassed a record of 9–2 before signing a four-fight contract with the Ultimate Fighting Championship in the summer of 2015.

Ultimate Fighting Championship
Cirkunov was expected to make his promotional debut against Sean O'Connell on August 23, 2015, at UFC Fight Night 74. O'Connell withdrew from the bout due to injury and was replaced by Daniel Jolly. Cirkunov defeated Jolly via first-round KO after achieving full mount and battering him when he turned his back.

Cirkunov faced promotional newcomer Alex Nicholson on February 6, 2016, at UFC Fight Night 82. Cirkunov submitted Alex Nicholson via a second-round neck crank, breaking both sides of his jaw in the process, after earlier breaking his nose. At the post-fight press conference, he told reporters, "I’m just really happy with the performance and especially – not just the submission – but I was able to break his jaw. I’m impressed."

Cirkunov next faced another promotional newcomer in Ion Cuțelaba on June 18, 2016, at UFC Fight Night 89. He won the fight via submission in the third round.

Cirkunov faced Nikita Krylov on December 10, 2016, at UFC 206. He won the fight via submission in the first round.

In March 2017, Cirkunov signed a new, six-fight deal with UFC and fought Volkan Oezdemir on May 28, 2017, at UFC Fight Night 109. He lost the fight via knockout in just 28 seconds of the very first round.

Cirkunov was scheduled to face Glover Teixeira on October 28, 2017, at UFC Fight Night 119. However, the pairing was delayed after a recent hand surgery for Teixeira was slow to heal and the bout eventually took place on December 16, 2017, at UFC on Fox 26. Cirkunov lost the fight via TKO in the first round.

Cirkunov faced Patrick Cummins on October 27, 2018, at UFC Fight Night 138. He won the fight by submission in the first round via an arm triangle choke.

Cirkunov was expected to face Ovince Saint Preux on March 2, 2019, at UFC 235. However, on February 11, it was announced that Saint Preux suffered an injury and was pulled from the fight. Cirkunov instead faced Johnny Walker. He lost the fight via TKO in the first round.

Cirkunov faced Jimmy Crute on September 14, 2019, at UFC Fight Night 158. He won the back-and-forth fight via a Peruvian necktie submission in the first round. The win also earned Cirkunov his first Performance of the Night bonus award.

Cirkunov was expected to face Ryan Spann on December 19, 2020, at UFC Fight Night 183. However, Cirkunov pulled out in early December due to an injury. The fight was rescheduled to March 13, 2021, at UFC Fight Night 187. Cirkunov lost the fight via technical knockout in round one.

Cirkunov faced Krzysztof Jotko in a middleweight bout on October 2, 2021, at UFC Fight Night 193. He lost the fight via split decision.

Cirkunov was scheduled to face Makhmud Muradov on February 26, 2022, at UFC Fight Night 202. However, Muradov pulled out in late January due to a hand injury and he was replaced by Wellington Turman. Cirkunov lost the fight via armbar in the second round.

After two straight losses at Middleweight, Misha was scheduled to return to Light heavyweight against Shamil Gamzatov on August 6, 2022, at UFC on ESPN: Santos vs. Hill. However, Gamzatov was unable to obtain a US visa and the bout was scrapped.

Cirkunov faced Alonzo Menifield on October 15, 2022, at UFC Fight Night 212. He lost the fight via knockout in round one.

In late October 2022, it was reported that Cirkunov was released by the UFC.

Championships and accomplishments

Mixed martial arts
Ultimate Fighting Championship
Performance of the Night (One time)  vs. Jimmy Crute

Mixed martial arts record

|Loss
|align=center|15–9
|Alonzo Menifield
|KO (punches)
|UFC Fight Night: Grasso vs. Araújo
|
|align=center|1
|align=center|1:28
|Las Vegas, Nevada, United States
|
|-
|Loss
|align=center|15–8
|Wellington Turman
|Submission (armbar)
|UFC Fight Night: Makhachev vs. Green
|
|align=center|2
|align=center|1:29
|Las Vegas, Nevada, United States
|
|-
|Loss
|align=center|15–7
|Krzysztof Jotko
|Decision (split)
|UFC Fight Night: Santos vs. Walker
|
|align=center|3
|align=center|5:00
|Las Vegas, Nevada, United States
|
|-
|Loss
|align=center|15–6
|Ryan Spann
|TKO (punches)
|UFC Fight Night: Edwards vs. Muhammad
|
|align=center|1
|align=center|1:11
|Las Vegas, Nevada, United States
|
|-
|Win
|align=center|15–5
|Jimmy Crute
|Submission (peruvian necktie)
|UFC Fight Night: Cowboy vs. Gaethje 
|
|align=center|1
|align=center|3:38
|Vancouver, British Columbia, Canada
|
|-
|Loss
|align=center|14–5
|Johnny Walker
|TKO (flying knee and punches)
|UFC 235
|
|align=center|1
|align=center|0:38
|Las Vegas, Nevada, United States
|
|-
|Win
|align=center|14–4
|Patrick Cummins
|Submission (arm-triangle choke)
|UFC Fight Night: Volkan vs. Smith
|
|align=center|1
|align=center|2:40
|Moncton, New Brunswick, Canada
|
|-
|Loss
|align=center|13–4
|Glover Teixeira
|TKO (punches)
|UFC on Fox: Lawler vs. dos Anjos
|
|align=center|1
|align=center|2:45
|Winnipeg, Manitoba, Canada
|
|-
|Loss
|align=center|13–3
|Volkan Oezdemir
|KO (punch)
|UFC Fight Night: Gustafsson vs. Teixeira
|
|align=center|1
|align=center|0:28
|Stockholm, Sweden
|
|-
|Win
|align=center|13–2
|Nikita Krylov
|Submission (guillotine choke)
|UFC 206
|
|align=center|1
|align=center|4:38
|Toronto, Ontario, Canada
|
|-
|Win
|align=center|12–2
|Ion Cuțelaba
|Submission (arm-triangle choke)
|UFC Fight Night: MacDonald vs. Thompson
|
|align=center|3
|align=center|1:22
|Ottawa, Ontario, Canada
|
|-
|Win
|align=center|11–2
|Alex Nicholson
|Submission (neck crank)
|UFC Fight Night: Hendricks vs. Thompson
|
|align=center|2
|align=center|1:28
|Las Vegas, Nevada, United States
|
|-
|Win
|align=center|10–2
|Daniel Jolly
|KO (punches)
|UFC Fight Night: Holloway vs. Oliveira
|
|align=center|1
|align=center|4:45
|Saskatoon, Saskatchewan, Canada
|
|-
|Win
|align=center| 9–2
|Shaun Asher
|Submission (armbar)
|Hard Knocks 43
|
|align=center|1
|align=center|1:20
|Calgary, Alberta, Canada
|
|-
|Win
|align=center| 8–2
|Rodney Wallace
|TKO (head kick)
|Hard Knocks 41
|
|align=center|1
|align=center|2:00
|Calgary, Alberta, Canada
|
|-
| Win
|align=center| 7–2
|Martin Desilets
|Submission (inverted triangle choke)
|Provincial FC 2
|
|align=center|1
|align=center|2:36
|London, Ontario, Canada
|
|-
| Win
|align=center| 6–2
|Jon Ganshorn
|Submission (armbar)
|Fivestar FL 9: Northern Nightmare
|
|align=center| 1
|align=center| 1:59
|Yellowknife, Northwest Territories, Canada
|
|-
| Loss
|align=center| 5–2
|Aaron Johnson
| Submission (heel hook)
|King of the Ring VI
|
|align=center|1
|align=center|2:11
|Norcross, Georgia, United States
|
|-
| Win
|align=center| 5–1
|Ali Mokdad
| Decision (unanimous)
|Score Fighting Series 3
|
|align=center|3
|align=center|5:00
|Sarnia, Ontario, Canada
|
|-
| Win
|align=center| 4–1
|Ion Cherdivara
| Decision (unanimous)
|Knockout Entertainment - MMA: The Reckoning
|
|align=center|3
|align=center|5:00
|Orillia, Ontario, Canada
|
|-
| Win
|align=center| 3–1
|Ricardeau Francois
| TKO (punches)
|Ultimate Generation Combat 26
|
|align=center|1
|align=center|0:56
|Montreal, Quebec, Canada
|
|-
| Win
|align=center| 2–1
|Shawn Pauliuk
| Submission (punches)
|Armageddon FC 3: Evolution
|
|align=center|1
|align=center|0:57
|Victoria, British Columbia, Canada
|
|-
| Loss
|align=center| 1–1
|Roy Boughton
| Submission (armbar)
|Warrior One MMA 5
|
|align=center|2
|align=center|2:33
|Montreal, Quebec, Canada
|
|-
| Win
|align=center| 1–0
|Jeff Doyle
| TKO (punches)
|Ringside MMA 5: Triple Threat
|
|align=center|1
|align=center|0:40
|Montreal, Quebec, Canada
|
|-

References

External links

Living people
1987 births
Sportspeople from Riga
Sportspeople from Toronto
Latvian male mixed martial artists
Latvian emigrants to Canada
Latvian male judoka
Latvian practitioners of Brazilian jiu-jitsu
Canadian people of Russian descent
Latvian people of Russian descent
Canadian male judoka
Canadian male mixed martial artists
Canadian male sport wrestlers
Canadian practitioners of Brazilian jiu-jitsu
People awarded a black belt in Brazilian jiu-jitsu
Light heavyweight mixed martial artists
Mixed martial artists utilizing judo
Mixed martial artists utilizing freestyle wrestling
Mixed martial artists utilizing Greco-Roman wrestling
Mixed martial artists utilizing Brazilian jiu-jitsu
Ultimate Fighting Championship male fighters